Conotelus is a genus of sap-feeding beetles in the family Nitidulidae. There are at least four described species in Conotelus.

Species
These four species belong to the genus Conotelus.
 Conotelus fuscipennis Erichson, 1843
 Conotelus mexicanus Murray, 1864
 Conotelus obscurus Erichson, 1843 (obscure sap beetle)
 Conotelus stenoides Murray, 1864

References

Further reading

 
 
 
 
 

Nitidulidae